China National Machinery Import and Export Corporation (CMC) is a Chinese international engineering contractor and subsidiary of China General Technology Group. It is a contractor in a range of projects, mainly industrial facilities and power plants.

Projects
One of the company's key international projects, completed in 2014, was the construction of the Ankara-Istanbul high-speed railway with China Railway Construction Corporation Limited and Turkish consortium partners.

In 2013–2019, CMC extended Sri Lanka's Coastal line from Matara to Beliatta. The line had terminated in Matara since 1895, and the extension to Beliatta was the first new railway built in Sri Lanka since independence from Great Britain in 1948.

References

Government-owned companies of China
Construction and civil engineering companies of China
Railway construction companies of China
Chinese companies established in 1950
Construction and civil engineering companies established in 1950
1950 establishments in China
1998 mergers and acquisitions